Rima Karaki  (Arabic: ريما كركي) is a Lebanese television show host, author and columnist. She is the presenter of the program Lel Nasher (للنشر), on the Lebanese television station Al Jadeed. She gained international notice from her interview with Hani al-Sibai. Prior to joining Al-Jadeed, she was the presenter of Alam al Sabah (عالم الصباح) on the Lebanese TV station Future TV.

Hani Al-Sibai interview 
In March 2015 she interviewed al-Qaeda supporter and former Egyptian Islamic Jihad member the Islamist scholar Hani al-Sibai. During the live television interview she cut him off after he had told her to "shut up" and said "It's beneath me to be interviewed by you. You are a woman who . . ." The interview went viral shortly after being released causing public outrage over his sexist remark. The video was viewed by more than five million viewers on YouTube within a week. Karaki stopped the interview after three minutes, saying: “Just one second. Either there is mutual respect or the conversation is over.” And she cut off his mic.

Books 
 Tonight I will confess (2009)

References 

Living people
Lebanese television presenters
Lebanese women television presenters
Lebanese writers
Lebanese columnists
Lebanese women writers
Lebanese women columnists
Year of birth missing (living people)